Symbolic representation may refer to:
 Symbol, an object that represents, stands for, or suggests an idea, belief, action, or material entity
 Symbolism (disambiguation), various meanings in art, religion, and science
 Symbolic linguistic representation, a representation of an utterance that uses symbols to represent linguistic information

See also
 Symbolic (disambiguation)
 Representation (disambiguation)